North Kent College is a further education and higher education college in Kent, England founded in 2014. Its campus in Tonbridge offers numerous courses and qualifications at many levels, from GCSEs and A-levels to vocational routes such as BTEC or NVQ/VRQ Diplomas to work-based Apprenticeships and Degree programmes, validated by the University of Kent, University of Greenwich and Canterbury Christ Church University.

The College's facilities include a 300-seat theatre, fine art, fashion, graphic design and photography studios and darkrooms, television and radio studios, music recording studios, professional training and demo kitchens and purpose-built motor vehicle engineering and construction workshops.

History
The original West Kent College institution operated in Tonbridge, Tunbridge Wells, Crowborough and Sevenoaks. 
The Tonbridge campus was redeveloped in the 2000s. Crowborough and Sevenoaks closed in 2006.

It merged into K College in 2010. K College operated across 6 campuses, at Jemmett Road and Henwood in Ashford, Dover, Folkestone, Tonbridge and Royal Tunbridge Wells.

It was subsequently split in 2014, after sustaining a large amount of debt. It was split into two units from 1 August that year:

Hadlow College Group took over the Tonbridge and Tunbridge Wells campuses as "West Kent College" and Ashford campus as "Ashford College" 
East Kent College took over Folkestone and Dover.

On 17 May 2019, Hadlow College become the first in the country to go into educational administration. That same year, following a review by the Further Education Commissioner, it was recommended that the Hadlow College Group be split up and taken on by three colleges: North Kent College, East Kent College Group and Capel Manor College.

On the 15th August 2020, the education-related facilities of West Kent College and Hadlow College, including Princess Christian’s Farm and  Hadlow College's equestrian centre in Greenwich, transferred to North Kent College.

Courses
The college offers a range of Foundation, Extended and BTEC Diplomas, A Levels, Higher Education programmes and NVQs, in subjects such as:
 Electronic Engineering
 Catering and Hospitality
 Construction: Bricklaying, Electrical Installation, Carpentry and Joinery, Plumbing
 Performing Arts, Music, Media and Photography
 Art and Design, Graphic Design, Fashion and Clothing
 Motor Vehicle Engineering
 Information Technology
 Beauty Therapy, Hair Design
 Early Years and Health and Social Care
 Business and Admin
 Applied Science (including Forensic Science Pathway)
 Sport
 Travel and Tourism
 ESOL

Also offered are Apprenticeships, A-Levels and Access to Higher Education courses.

Notable alumni

Marcus Dillistone Royal premiered film director and Music Producer Athens 2004 Olympic Ceremonies.
Jonathan Shaw (politician), British Labour Party politician who was the Member of Parliament (MP) for Chatham and Aylesford, now CEO of Policy Connect
Mark Sargeant, Michelin starred chef and restaurateur
Ron Thornton, Emmy-winning visual effects designer, supervisor, producer and co-founder of Foundation Imaging, whose work featured in Dr. Who, various Star Trek series, Blakes 7, Babylon 5, Buffy the Vampire Slayer and films including Real Genius, Commando (1985 film), Critters (film), Robot Jox and Spaceballs 
Chris Tanner, chef
James Tanner, chef
Jake West, film director
Mo Abudu, talk show host, media proprietor
Sophie, Countess of Wessex
Jilly Goolden, wine critic, journalist and presenter
Tim Garland, jazz saxophonist who has collaborated with Chick Corea and Bill Bruford 
Hazel Crowney, actress, model
Nicki French, singer, actress
Emily Walder, film editor, known for her work on the Oscar-winning film The Silent Child 
Andrew James Spooner, puppeteer, actor, voiceover artist, known for his work on Muppets Most Wanted, Muppet Treasure Island and The Furchester Hotel.
Gary James, actor, writer & co-presenter of The Tube (TV series)
Jake Hill, racing driver
Robert Smith, racing driver.

References

External links
West Kent College

Further education colleges in Kent
Higher education colleges in England
Educational institutions established in 2014
2014 establishments in England
Tonbridge
Tonbridge and Malling